An abra is a traditional boat made of wood. 

Abras are used to ferry people across the Dubai Creek in Dubai, United Arab Emirates. They travel between the water station at Shindagha/Al Ghubaiba on the Bur Dubai side, and the water station at Al Sabkha on the Deira side. The abras depart every few minutes. The fare is 1 dirham, which is paid to the ferry driver.

See also

 Water taxi

References 

Transport in Dubai
Boat types
Arab inventions